Louis Jean Bush was a lawyer, state legislator, and businessman in Louisiana. He opposed secession, served as an officer in the Confederate Army, was a critic of Reconstruction policies, had a sugar and molasses business, and was elected to the Louisiana House of Representatives as the Reconstruction era ended.

He served as Speaker of the Louisiana House of Representatives.

He was involved in establishing Thibodaux College.

See also
List of speakers of the Louisiana House of Representatives

References

Further reading
Dictionary of Louisiana Biography

External links
Findagrave entry

Year of birth missing (living people)
Living people